Wild Western (originally titled Wild West) was a Western comic book series published by Atlas Comics, the 1950s forerunner of Marvel Comics. The anthology series published 57 issues from 1948 to 1957. Kid Colt stories were usually the lead feature and a prominent cover element throughout the series' run, while most issues also featured the Two-Gun Kid and the Black Rider. Other recurring characters  included Tex Taylor, Arizona Annie, the Apache Kid, and the Ringo Kid.

Publication history 
The series published two issues as Wild West before changing its title to Wild Western. It was edited throughout by Stan Lee, who also contributed a number of stories as writer.

The primary recurring feature was "Kid Colt", which generally led each issue of Wild Western while simultaneously starring in his own title.

Other features starred the first of several Marvel characters dubbed the Two-Gun Kid, Clay Harder, who appeared in most issues from #1-42; the vigilante Tex Taylor, introduced in Wild West #1 and appearing through #11, when he was replaced by the short-lived feature starring the Prairie Kid; the female gunslinger Arizona Annie, who appeared in the first four issues before replaced by the Black Rider through #50; the Apache Kid in issues #15-22; and the Ringo Kid from #38 until the end of the book's run, initially drawn by Joe Maneely, with John Severin taking the reins in at least issues #46-47.

Other recurring features included "Tex Morgan", "Blaze Carson", "Red Hawkins, Gunhawk",  the "Arizona Kid", the "Texas Kid", and "Arrowhead".

References

External links 
 Wild Western at Atlas Tales

Comics magazines published in the United States
Western (genre) comics
1948 comics debuts
1957 comics endings
Atlas Comics titles
Marvel Comics titles
Magazines established in 1948
Magazines disestablished in 1957